Prince Fatafehi Alaivahamamao Tuku'aho, styled Lord Ma'atu (17 February 1954 – 17 December 2004) was a Tongan Prince and member of the Tongan Royal Family.

Early life 
Prince Fatafehi 'Alaivahamama'o Tuku'aho was the second son of Crown Prince Tāufaʻāhau and his wife, Crown Princess Halaevalu Mataʻaho, and a grandchild of Queen Sālote Tupou III of Tonga. He died in Nuku'alofa, Tonga on 17 December 2004 of a heart attack and is buried in the Royal Tongan Cemetery known as Malaʻekula.

Prince Fatafehi 'Alaivahamama'o was known to be a staunch advocate for the growing democratic movement in Tonga and was dubbed the "people's Prince" by activists.

Personal life and Issue 
Lord Maatu and Dowager Lady Ma'atu have four children. 

 Prince Tungi, formally known as the  Honourable Sitiveni Polu Le'uligana;
 Salote Maumautaimi Tuku'aho whom is the only daughter of Lord Ma'atu and Alaileula Tuku'aho;
 Sione Ikamafana Tuku'aho;
 Etani Ha'amea Tuku'aho.

Family life 
Upon the passing of Prince Ma'atu, his eldest son Sitiveni Polu Le'uligana inherited the title, as Prince Tungi.

The second son, Sione Ikamafana Tuku'aho was raised by his paternal Aunt, Princess Salote Mafileʻo Pilolevu Tuita. Such practice is commonplace amongst the Tongan royal family, whereby Princess Lātūfuipeka was also raised by her uncle, King George Tupou V.

Controversy 
The then Prince Fatafehi 'Alaivahamamao Tuku'aho who was third in line to the throne, caused controversy in the Tongan royal family when he married his first wife, a commoner, Heimataura Seiloni on 21 July 1980 in a private ceremony in Hawaii. Heimataura Seiloni was the adopted daughter of High Chief Matagialalua Tavana Salmon Anderson of Tahiti and daughter of his wife Tongan singer and songwriter, Tuimala Kaho. The marriage resulted in Prince Fatafehi being stripped of his 'Princely' title. His wife later died of cancer in Nukualofa, 19 September 1985. Upon returning to Tonga after the passing of his first wife, he married 'Alaileula Poutasi Jungblut on 11 July 1989. ‘Alaileula is the granddaughter of the late Samoan head of state, Malietoa Tanumafili II.

Upon Prince Ma'atu's passing, his widow Alaileula Tuku'aho was embroiled in controversy regarding the killing of a pig. This royal rift caused Alaileula Tuku'aho to return to Samoa for a brief time before resolving the issue with the royal family.

References 

1954 births
2004 deaths
Tongan nobles
Sons of kings